Amherstia nobilis (the Pride of Burma, in the family Fabaceae) is a tropical tree with large, showy flowers. It is the only member of the genus Amherstia. It is widely cultivated for ornament in the humid tropics, but is very rare in the wild and has only been collected from its native habitat a few times. It is native to Burma (Myanmar), hence the common name. The scientific name commemorates Lady Amherst, (as does Lady Amherst's pheasant) and also her daughter Sarah. Another common name, orchid tree, is also used for members of the genus Bauhinia.

Description
The extravagant flowers are seen hanging from the long inflorescence, or flower stalk, which is a bright crimson red at the end. There are 5 petals although 2 of these are minute and the rest are of unequal size. These petals are also crimson; the two medium-sized petals are yellow at the tip and the largest petal is broad and fan-shaped with a wavy upper margin and a yellow triangle of colour extending from the lip down into the flower. This large petal can reach 7.5 centimetres long and over 4 centimetres wide at the end. There are either 9 or 10 stamens, 9 of which are partially fused into a pink sheath; the stamens are of two differing lengths with the longer ones having larger anthers. The compound leaves bear 6 - 8 large leaflets; these are broadly oblong in shape and are pallid underneath.

The fruits (legumes) are 11 to 20 centimetres long. They are roughly scimitar-shaped pods, and the woody outer case opens to disperse the seeds.

Gallery

References

External links

 From the ARKive digital database

Detarioideae
Monotypic Fabaceae genera
Trees of Myanmar
Ornamental trees